Josh Kerr (born 11 February 1996) is an Australian rugby league footballer who plays as a  for the St. George Illawarra Dragons in the NRL.

He previously played for the Indigenous All Stars.

Background
Kerr was born in Brisbane, Queensland, Australia.

He was a Redcliffe Dolphins junior and was signed to play in the Melbourne Storm's Under 20s.

Career

2019
Kerr represented the Indigenous All Stars in the 2019 All Stars match. On 21 March 2019, round 2 Kerr made his NRL debut for St. George Illawarra against the South Sydney Rabbitohs.

2020
Kerr played all 20 games for St. George Illawarra scoring two tries. Kerr's form got him selected for the Queensland 27 man squad for the 2020 State of Origin series, where Kerr played no games in Queensland's 2-1 Series win, however Kerr was 18th man in Origin 2.

2021
Kerr played a total of 19 matches for St. George Illawarra in the 2021 NRL season and scored two tries as the club finished 11th on the table and missed out on the finals.

2022
Kerr played seven games for the club in the 2022 NRL season as they finished 10th on the table and missed the finals for a fourth straight year.

Statistics

Controversy
On 5 July 2021, Kerr was fined $18,000 by the NRL and suspended for one game after breaching the game's Covid-19 biosecurity protocols when he  attended a party along with 12 other St. George Illawarra players at Paul Vaughan's property.

References

External links
Dragons profile

1996 births
Indigenous Australian rugby league players
Australian rugby league players
St. George Illawarra Dragons players
Rugby league props
Living people
Rugby league players from Brisbane